Sirakan Tadevosi Tigranyan (1875–1937) was an Armenian politician who served as Ministry of Foreign Affairs of the First Republic of Armenia from 1918 to 1919.

In a letter to his wife, the first prime minister of Armenia, Hovhannes Kajaznuni, described Tigranyan as "quite trained, able to judge, but at the same time he has an abstract, fruitless and unsophisticated mind."

References 

1875 births
1947 deaths
People from Gyumri
People from Erivan Governorate
Armenian Revolutionary Federation politicians
Foreign ministers of Armenia
Members of the 2nd State Duma of the Russian Empire
Russian Constituent Assembly members
People of the First Republic of Armenia
Armenian people executed by the Soviet Union